Glenn Bijl (born 13 July 1995) is a Dutch football player who plays as a right-back for Russian Premier League club PFC Krylia Sovetov Samara.

Club career
Bijl made his professional debut in the Eerste Divisie for FC Dordrecht on 15 January 2016 in a game against FC Eindhoven. 

On 12 August 2018, he scored FC Emmen's first ever goal in the Eredivisie.

On 25 August 2021, he signed a three-year contract with Russian club PFC Krylia Sovetov Samara. On 14 December 2022, Bijl extended his contract with Krylia Sovetov until 2025.

Career statistics

References

External links
 

1995 births
People from Stadskanaal
Footballers from Groningen (province)
Living people
Dutch footballers
Association football fullbacks
Association football midfielders
FC Groningen players
FC Dordrecht players
FC Emmen players
PFC Krylia Sovetov Samara players
Eredivisie players
Eerste Divisie players
Derde Divisie players
Russian Premier League players
Dutch expatriate footballers
Expatriate footballers in Russia
Dutch expatriate sportspeople in Russia